Hubin (Lepelsk County) - village in 19th Century in Lepelsk County, today in Belarus
Hubin (Buczacz County) - village in 19th Century in Buczacz County, today in Ukraine

Chinese places
Hubin District (湖滨区), - a district of Sanmenxia, Henan
Hubin, Yueyang (湖滨街道), - a subdistrict of Yueyanglou District, Yueyang, Hunan